Coleophora zymotica is a moth of the family Coleophoridae. It is found in Chaco, Paraguay.

References

zymotica
Moths described in 1931
Fauna of Paraguay
Moths of South America